The Nikon AF Zoom-Nikkor 35–70 mm 3.3-4.5  is one of Nikon's zoom lenses for the 35mm format. The combination of low cost and convenience makes this a popular lens among many photographers.

References

Nikon F-mount lenses
Products introduced in 1986